The 2003 Tyrolean state election was held on 28 September 2003 to elect the members of the Landtag of Tyrol.

The Austrian People's Party (ÖVP) regained the absolute majority it had lost in 1999, winning just under 50% of votes cast. The Social Democratic Party of Austria (SPÖ) made gains, and The Greens achieved one of their best election results nationwide up to this point, winning 15.6% and five seats. This was enabled by a collapse in support for the Freedom Party of Austria (FPÖ), which lost more than half its vote share and five of its seven seats.

The election was marked by a major decline in participation due to the repeal of compulsory voting; turnout fell from 81% to 61%. As a result, only the Greens actually gained votes compared to 1999, recording an increase of 17,000. By contrast, the ÖVP lost 19,000 votes, the SPÖ 500, and the FPÖ 45,000.

Despite regaining its majority, the ÖVP under Governor Herwig van Staa chose to renew the incumbent coalition with the SPÖ.

Background
In the 1999 election, the ÖVP narrowly lost its absolute majority for the first time in history; the SPÖ and FPÖ each made gains, while the Greens suffered losses. The ÖVP formed a coalition with the SPÖ.

In 2002, Governor Wendelin Weingartner his pending retirement. He was replaced by Innsbruck mayor Herwig van Staa in October.

Electoral system
The 36 seats of the Landtag of Tyrol are elected via open list proportional representation in a two-step process. The seats are distributed between nine multi-member constituencies, corresponding to the districts of Tyrol. For parties to receive any representation in the Landtag, they must either win at least one seat in a constituency directly, or clear a 5 percent state-wide electoral threshold. Seats are distributed in constituencies according to the Hare quota, with any remaining seats allocated using the D'Hondt method at the state level, to ensure overall proportionality between a party's vote share and its share of seats.

Contesting parties
The table below lists parties represented in the previous Landtag.

In addition to the parties already represented in the Landtag, one party collected enough signatures to be placed on the ballot.

 Communist Party of Austria (KPÖ) – on the ballot only in Innsbruck City, Innsbruck-Land, and Kufstein

Results

Results by constituency

References

Tyrolean state election
State elections in Austria
Tyrolean state election
Tyrol (state)